Yuan Li (born 19 September 1978) is a Chinese fencer. She competed in the women's individual and team foil events at the 2000 Summer Olympics.

References

1978 births
Living people
Chinese female fencers
Olympic fencers of China
Fencers at the 2000 Summer Olympics